Riad Bajić (born 6 May 1994) is a Bosnian professional footballer who plays as a forward for Süper Lig club Giresunspor.

Bajić started his professional career at Željezničar, before joining Konyaspor in 2015. Two years later, he signed with Udinese, who loaned him to İstanbul Başakşehir in 2018, back to Konyaspor in 2019, to Ascoli in 2020 and to Brescia in 2021. The following year, he moved to Giresunspor.

A former youth international for Bosnia and Herzegovina, Bajić made his senior international debut in 2017, earning 12 caps until 2019.

Club career

Željezničar
Bajić came through youth academy of his hometown club Željezničar, which he joined in 2003. In May 2013, he signed his first professional contract with the team. He made his professional debut against Zvijezda Gradačac on 27 July at the age of 19. On 19 October, he scored his first professional goal in a triumph over Mladost Velika Obarska.

Bajić scored his first career hat-trick on 27 September 2014. With 15 goals, he finished 2014–15 season as league's top scorer.

Konyaspor
In August 2015, Bajić signed a three-year deal with Turkish outfit Konyaspor. He made his official debut for the side on 15 August against Akhisarspor. On 17 October, he scored his first goal for the team against Gaziantepspor.

In January 2017, he extended his contract until June 2020. That season, Bajić finished as club's top goalscorer. His 17 goals were most league goals scored by a Konyaspor player in a single campaign, beating the previous mark of 13 set by Theofanis Gekas.

He won his first title with Konyaspor, club's first trophy ever, on 31 May, by beating İstanbul Başakşehir in Turkish Cup final.

Udinese
In August, Bajić was transferred to Italian side Udinese for an undisclosed fee. He made his competitive debut for the team in Coppa Italia game against Frosinone on 12 August. Five weeks later, he made his league debut against Milan.

In January 2018, he was sent on a six-month loan to İstanbul Başakşehir. In June, his loan was extended for an additional season.

In June 2019, Bajić was loaned to his former team Konyaspor until the end of season.

In September 2020, he was sent on a season-long loan to Ascoli.

In July 2021, he was loaned to Brescia for the remainder of campaign.

Later stage of career
In July 2022, Bajić moved to Giresunspor.

International career
Bajić represented Bosnia and Herzegovina at various youth levels.

In March 2015, he received his first senior call-up, for a UEFA Euro 2016 qualifier against Andorra and a friendly game against Austria, but had to wait until 25 March 2017 to make his debut in a 2018 FIFA World Cup qualifier against Gibraltar.

Personal life
Bajić married his long-time girlfriend Sanita in September 2019. Together they have a son named Dal.

Career statistics

Club

International

Honours
Konyaspor
Turkish Cup: 2016–17

Individual
Bosnian Premier League Top Goalscorer: 2014–15

References

External links

1994 births
Living people
Footballers from Sarajevo
Bosniaks of Bosnia and Herzegovina
Bosnia and Herzegovina Muslims
Bosnia and Herzegovina footballers
Bosnia and Herzegovina youth international footballers
Bosnia and Herzegovina under-21 international footballers
Bosnia and Herzegovina international footballers
Bosnia and Herzegovina expatriate footballers
Association football forwards
FK Željezničar Sarajevo players
Konyaspor footballers
Udinese Calcio players
İstanbul Başakşehir F.K. players
Ascoli Calcio 1898 F.C. players
Brescia Calcio players
Giresunspor footballers
Premier League of Bosnia and Herzegovina players
Süper Lig players
Serie A players
Serie B players
Expatriate footballers in Turkey
Expatriate footballers in Italy
Bosnia and Herzegovina expatriate sportspeople in Turkey
Bosnia and Herzegovina expatriate sportspeople in Italy